The Buffalo Boy is a 2004 film directed by Nguyễn Võ Nghiêm Minh. The movie was the official entry from Vietnam for Best Foreign Language Film category at the 78th Academy Awards. It was filmed in Cà Mau Province, Vietnam's southernmost province.

Plot summary
An old man named, Kim is telling his family history to his grand daughter, as she found the bones of his father.

When he was a boy, Kim's father was ill, when their lands flooded. His two buffaloes have no forage. Kim takes the two buffaloes in search of good grass. He joins Lap's herding team, but One of the two buffaloes dies.

Later he helps Det, who builds a new herding team with him, to reunite with his girl friend and their son, whom Det hasn't seen for 5 years.

When Kim hears his father is dying, he goes to U Minh. The father reveals the truth of Kim's ancestry. A couple of strangers help Kim put his father's corpse in a safe place in the water, until the flooding subsides and he can be properly buried.

Lap confirms what Kim's father told him as he died:--that Kim's true mother is the sister of Lap, whom Kim's father raped on a buffalo herding run.

Kim tries to rape Det's wife. Det dies in a skirmish between Lap's and Kieng's buffalo herding teams. Kim adopts Det's son, Thieu.

In a voiceover, Kim says that the Japanese came in to drive out the French, and then were themselves driven out. This political change does not seem to affect rural Vietnam.

External links

2004 films
2004 drama films
Vietnamese-language films
Films about farmers
2004 in Vietnam
Films shot in Vietnam
Vietnamese drama films